Hradec is a municipality and village in Havlíčkův Brod District in the Vysočina Region of the Czech Republic. It has about 300 inhabitants.

Administrative parts
The village of Hamry is an administrative part of Hradec.

References

Villages in Havlíčkův Brod District